Iceland made its Paralympic Games début at the 1980 Summer Paralympics in Arnhem, where it fielded thirteen athletes, who won two medals (a gold and a silver). Since then, the country has competed in every edition of the Summer Paralympics.

Despite its climate, and despite having participated in every edition (bar one) of the Winter Olympics, Iceland has been a highly infrequent participant in the Winter Paralympic Games. It made its Winter Paralympics début at the 1994 Winter Paralympics, sending just one representative, Svanur Ingvarsson in ice sledge speed racing. The country was then absent from the Winter Paralympics for sixteen years, before making its return at the 2010 Games in Vancouver - again with just one athlete, Erna Friðriksdóttir in alpine skiing.

Icelandic athletes have won a total of sixty-one Paralympic medals, all at the Summer Games: fourteen gold, thirteen silver and thirty-four bronze. This places Iceland in forty-seventh place on the all-time Paralympic Games medal table.

Medalists

See also
Iceland at the Olympics

References